Terminalia kuhlmannii is a species of plant in the Combretaceae family. It is endemic to Brazil.  It is threatened by habitat loss.

References

Endemic flora of Brazil
kuhlmannii
Vulnerable plants
Taxonomy articles created by Polbot